Yarımca station is railway station located in Körfez, Turkey. Situated on the northern shore of the Gulf of İzmit, it is one of the three operating stations between Gebze and İzmit, the other two being Hereke and Derince. The station is currently served by the Ada Express, which consists of four round trips between Pendik, Istanbul and Mithatpaşa, Adapazarı.

Yarımca station was originally named Körfez until 2012, when the station underwent a complete overhaul. During the reconstruction, the station was reduced from 2 platforms servicing 3 tracks, to 1 platform servicing 1 track. The name was changed to Yarımca and service was greatly reduced. Before 2012, Yarımca was serviced by the famous Haydarpaşa-Adapazarı Regional as well as several other mainline trains.

Yarımca station was originally built by the Ottoman Government in 1873 as part of their line from Istanbul to İzmit.

Connections
 Kocaeli Bus Service

References

External links
 Haydarpaşa-Adapazarı Regional Timetables

Railway stations in Kocaeli Province
Railway stations opened in 1873
1873 establishments in the Ottoman Empire